Roy Gibson is a British Classicist and Professor at Durham University. Specialising in Latin Literature, he has worked extensively on the imperial period, with a focus on Ovid and Pliny the Younger. Gibson is also the joint-chair of the Classical Association and serves on the editorial board of the Journal of Roman Studies.

Career
Gibson studied Classics at Sidney Sussex College, Cambridge, leading to a BA (1987) and later a PhD (1993). He then went on to become a Research Fellow at the same college. From 1994, he worked at the University of Manchester and was promoted to a professorship in 2004. In 2018, Gibson was appointed Professor of Latin at Durham University.

Selected publications
 The Classical Commentary: Histories, Practices, Theory, edited with C. S. Kraus, Brill, 2002
 Ovid, Ars Amatoria, Book 3, Cambridge University Press, 2003
 The Art of Love. Bimillennial Essays on Ovid's "Ars Amatoria" and "Remedia Amoris", edited with S. Green and A. Sharrock, Oxford University Press, 2006
 Excess and Restraint: Propertius, Horace, and Ovid’s Ars Amatoria, Institute of Classical Studies, 2007
 Pliny the Elder: Themes and Contexts, edited with R. Morello, Brill, 2011
Reading The Letters of Pliny the Younger: An Introduction, with Ruth Morello, Cambridge University Press, 2012

References

British classical scholars
Alumni of Sidney Sussex College, Cambridge
Alumni of the University of Cambridge
Classical scholars of the University of Durham
Living people
Year of birth missing (living people)